Wake Technical Community College (Wake Tech) is a public community college in Raleigh, North Carolina. Its first location, Southern Wake Campus, opened in 1963. Wake Tech now operates multiple campuses throughout Wake County. The largest community college in North Carolina, Wake Tech is part of the North Carolina Community College System and is accredited by the Southern Association of Colleges and Schools Commission on Colleges.

History
Wake Tech was chartered in 1958 as the Wake County Industrial Education Center. The school opened its doors on October 7, 1963, with 304 enrolled students, 34 in curriculum studies on campus and 270 in industrial training programs.

Campuses

Southern Wake Campus

The first campus to be built, Southern Wake Campus (formerly referred to as Main Campus) is located near McCullers Crossroads on US 401 between Raleigh and Fuquay-Varina. Its buildings feature classrooms and labs for technical training in various fields. Other buildings include historic Holding Hall (the college's first building) and Montague Hall, which houses administrative offices. The Southern Wake Campus also has a library, an individualized learning center, a bookstore, a gymnasium, and dining options.

Perry Health Sciences Campus
Wake Tech's health sciences programs prepare students for careers in multiple health professions. The college has partnerships with the region's medical facilities, providing students with hands-on training and co-op work. The Perry Health Sciences Campus is located in east Raleigh adjacent to the WakeMed main site.

Beltline Education Center
Located north of downtown Raleigh, the Beltline Education Center houses the Workforce Continuing Education Division and College & Career Readiness programs.

Public Safety Education Campus
Located in south Raleigh, the Public Safety Education Campus is the only North Carolina community college recognized as a CALEA Accredited Training Academy. The campus trains thousands of public safety professionals each year.
PSEC also provides short-term training programs as needed.

Western Wake Campus
The Western Wake Campus is home to the Business and Industry Services Division. Western Wake offers the Associate in Arts Degree Program for college transfer, along with non-credit classes. The campus is located in Millpond Village on Kildaire Farm Road in southern Cary.

Scott Northern Wake Campus

The Northern Wake Campus opened in 2007 in northeast Raleigh off US 401. It was the first in the nation to have all buildings LEED-certified by the U.S. Green Building Council. The Northern Wake Campus offers the Associate in Arts and Associate in Science degrees for college transfer as well as evening and weekend continuing education classes.

In August 2018, the Wake Tech Board of Trustees voted to change the name of the campus to the Scott Northern Wake Campus.  The Scott Northern Wake Campus was renamed to honor retiring president, and current President Emeritus, Dr. Stephen C. Scott

Eastern Wake Education Center
The Eastern Wake Education Center in Zebulon provides non-credit training for residents in the eastern part of Wake County. Programs include vocational classes taught in English and Spanish.

BioNetwork Capstone Center
Located on the campus of North Carolina State University, the BioNetwork Capstone Center provides hands-on training in a simulated biomanufacturing facility.

Joint ventures with the Wake County Public School System
The Vernon Malone College and Career Academy in south Raleigh and the North Wake College and Career Academy (also known as the Career and Technical Education High School) in Wake Forest allow students to complete high school while earning college credits that can be applied toward an associate degree, diploma, or certificate at Wake Tech.

Research Triangle Park Campus
In 2008 Wake Tech purchased 94 acres of land near Interstate 40 and Interstate 540 in Morrisville for a campus near Research Triangle Park. The RTP Campus is slated to include 10 buildings and accommodate 7,000 students. The first building of the Wake Tech RTP Campus opened in August 2018.

Other

Wake Tech provides instruction online and at numerous Community Learning Sites in high schools, government buildings, churches, and senior centers.

Athletics
Wake Tech established an athletics program in 2008. Tech Athletics includes nine teams: men's baseball; women's softball and volleyball; and men's and women's basketball, men's and women's golf, and men's and women's soccer. Wake Tech's mascot is an eagle named Talon and sponsors a co-ed cheerleading and mascot team. The college is a member of Region X of the National Junior College Athletic Association.

Alumni
 Nazmi Albadawi, professional soccer player
 Eric Swann, professional football player

Faculty
 Dana Trent, full-time Humanities faculty member, author

References

External links

 

Two-year colleges in the United States
North Carolina Community College System colleges
Universities and colleges in Raleigh, North Carolina
Universities and colleges in the Research Triangle
Educational institutions established in 1958
Universities and colleges in Wake County, North Carolina
NJCAA athletics
1958 establishments in North Carolina